Charley One-Eye is a 1973 British-American film directed by Don Chaffey and starring Richard Roundtree, Roy Thinnes and Nigel Davenport.

The film was entered into the 24th Berlin International Film Festival.

Plot

A black Union Army deserter and his crippled American Indian hostage form a strained partnership in the interests of surviving the advancing threats of a racist bounty hunter and neighboring bandits.

Cast
 Richard Roundtree as Ben, The Black Man
 Roy Thinnes as The Indian
 Nigel Davenport as The Bounty Hunter
 Jill Pearson as Officer's Wife
 Aldo Sambrell as Mexican Driver
 Luis Aller as Mexican Youth
 Rafael Albaicín as Mexican Leader
 Alexander Davion as Tony (uncredited)

See also
 List of American films of 1973

References

External links
 
 
 
 
 

1973 films
1973 Western (genre) films
American Western (genre) films
British Western (genre) films
1970s English-language films
Films about race and ethnicity
Films directed by Don Chaffey
Films scored by John Cameron
Films shot in Almería
1973 drama films
1970s American films
1970s British films